Liangshanella is a genus of Cambrian bradoriid known from the Chengjiang biota and Burgess Shale. 6263 specimens of Liangshanella are known from the Greater Phyllopod bed, where they comprise 11.9% of the community.

See also

 Cambrian explosion
 List of Chengjiang Biota species by phylum

References

External links 
 

Burgess Shale fossils
Cambrian arthropods
Maotianshan shales fossils
Cambrian genus extinctions